A home invasion is an illegal and usually forceful entry to an occupied, private dwelling with violent intent to commit a crime against the occupants. It may also refer to:
Home Invasion (album), fifth solo album by the artist Ice-T
"Home Invasion" (American Horror Story): second episode of the first season of the television series American Horror Story
"Home Invasion" (Arrow): twentieth episode of the first season of the television series Arrow
"Home Invasion" (TMNT Fast Forward), an episode from the television series Teenage Mutant Ninja Turtles
"Home Invasion" (White Collar episode) an episode from the first season of the television series White Collar
Home Invasion (film), a 2016 film
 "Home Invasion" song by horrorcore artist Violent J